Rustomji Jamshedji Dorabji Jamshedji  (18 November 1892 – 5 April 1976) was an Indian Test cricketer.

Jamshedji was a little left arm spinner who played a single Test for India. He made his debut at the age of 41 years and 27 days and is still the oldest Indian on his debut. In the Test at Bombay Gymkhana against England in 1933/34, he took three wickets in the England innings.

Most of Jamshedji's noted successes were in the Bombay Quadrangular. Playing for Parsis, he took 11 for 122 in the 1922/23 final against the Hindus and 10 for 104 in the 1928/29 final against the Europeans. On the latter occasion, 'wild scenes of jubilation were witnessed after the match and the Parsi team was mobbed by the admiring crowd'. Jamshedji was chaired and carried to the pavilion .

Jamshedji came across the English left arm spinner Wilfred Rhodes in the early 1920s when the latter played in the Bombay tournament. Rhodes is supposed to have told Jamshedji : If I had your powers of spin, no side would get a hundred. Jamshedji carried violin resin in his pocket to keep his finger supple.

Notes
 In his Cricinfo article From Palwankar to Nayudu, Partab Ramchand names him as "Rusi" Jamshedji. Ramachandra Guha  calls him "Jamsu".

References

  Ramachandra Guha, A Corner of a Foreign Field (2002), p. 79
  Guha, Fielding a Parsi, The Hindu, 18 August 2002  (accessed 9 September 2005)

External links

Indian cricketers
India Test cricketers
Parsees cricketers
Mumbai cricketers
Parsi people from Mumbai
1976 deaths
1892 births
Cricketers from Mumbai